The New Brunswick and Nova Scotia Land Company was one of several organizations which were established in Canada in the nineteenth century as a means of transferring land held by the Crown to individual owners. This company was chartered in New Brunswick in 1831.

History
Several large land companies were established in the mid-nineteenth century in Canada. The Canada Company was founded in Ontario in 1824 (received its charter in 1826). The New Brunswick and Nova Scotial Land Company was created in New Brunswick in 1831, and received its charter in 1834. The British American Land Company was established in Quebec in 1832, and received its charter in 1834.

These companies, financed by shares sold in England, purchased large areas of Canadian land at low prices, promising to develop roads, mills and towns.

Over the years, the Company tried various schemes to entice settlers from various English counties. The lease was for 50 years at a rent of one shilling per acre, with an option to purchase the freehold in 20 years' time. The company also promised employment on road works, provisions at moderate prices, and medical assistance, and offered to advance the cost of transit as a loan.

References

Report of the Directors of the New Brunswick and Nova Scotia Land Company (London: Arthur Taylor, 1832), Canadian Institute for Historic Microreproductions (CIHM) fiche N.63916, pp. 8, 11 (cited in Elliott)
Little, J.I. Feast or Famine: The British American Land Company and the Colonization of the St Francis Tract (section of Nationalism, Capitalism, and Colonization in Nineteenth-Century Quebec: The Upper St Francis District), Kingston & Montreal: McGill-Queen's University Press, 1989, pp. 36–63 (cited in Elliott)

Economic history of Canada
Defunct companies of New Brunswick
Defunct companies of Nova Scotia
Former Canadian federal departments and agencies
Companies established in 1831
1831 establishments in New Brunswick